Uzodinma Iweala  (born November 5) is a Nigerian-American author and medical doctor. His debut novel, Beasts of No Nation, is a formation of his thesis work (in creative writing) at Harvard. It depicts a child soldier in an unnamed African country. The book, published in 2005 and adapted as an award-winning film in 2015, was mentioned by Time Magazine, The New York Times, Entertainment Weekly, The Times, and Rolling Stone. In 2012, he released the non-fiction book Our Kind of People, about the HIV/AIDS epidemic in Nigeria. He later released a novel titled Speak No Evil, published in 2018, which highlights the life of a gay Nigerian-American boy named Niru.

Iweala is currently the CEO of The Africa Center in Harlem, New York.

Family and education
The son of Dr. Ngozi Okonjo-Iweala, Iweala attended St. Albans School in Washington D.C. and later Harvard College, from which he graduated with an A.B., magna cum laude, in English and American Literature and Language, in 2004. His roommate at Harvard was the future mayor of South Bend, Indiana and U.S. transportation secretary Pete Buttigieg. While at Harvard, Iweala earned the Hoopes Prize and Dorothy Hicks Lee Prize for Outstanding Undergraduate Thesis, 2004; Eager Prize for Best Undergraduate Short Story, 2003; and the Horman Prize for Excellence in Creative Writing, 2003. He graduated from Columbia University College of Physicians and Surgeons in 2011 and was a fellow at the Radcliffe Institute for Advanced Study at Harvard University.

Novels

Beasts of No Nation (2005)

Speak No Evil (2018) 
In his second novel, Iweala explores the intersections of race, class, gender, sexuality, nationality and the diaspora through the story of Niru, a Nigerian-American high-school senior living in a middle-class suburb of Washington, D.C., who comes out as gay to his white straight friend Meredith. The first two thirds of the book are narrated by Niru while the last third is narrated by Meredith. Niru must learn how to negotiate his many identities: being a Black man in America, being the child of Nigerian immigrants, coming from a middle-class background, as well as being gay. Niru is forced to confront the many ways in which he is privileged, as well as disenfranchised. Iweala also interweaves themes of religion, cultural dislocation, mental health, police brutality, and more, all of which further add to and further complicate Niru's life and identities.

Literary awards 
In 2006, Iweala won the New York Public Library's Young Lions Fiction Award. In 2007, he was named as one of Granta magazine's 20 best young American novelists.

References

External links
 Audio: Uzodinma Iweala reading from Beasts of No Nation at the Key West Literary Seminar, 2008.
 Audio: Iweala reads from work-in-progress about people living with HIV/AIDS in Nigeria. From Key West Literary Seminar, 2008.
 Radio interview on Bookworm.
 Andrea Sachs, "Galley Girl Catches Up With Uzodinma Iweala" (interview), Time magazine, November 29, 2005.

Igbo writers
Nigerian male novelists
1982 births
Living people
Harvard College alumni
John Llewellyn Rhys Prize winners
St. Albans School (Washington, D.C.) alumni
Columbia University Vagelos College of Physicians and Surgeons alumni
American people of Igbo descent
African-American novelists
American male novelists
21st-century American novelists
21st-century Nigerian novelists
21st-century American male writers
21st-century African-American writers
20th-century African-American people
African-American male writers
Vanity Fair (magazine) people